Xano is the name of:

 Xano, a Portuguese hypocoristic of the name "Alexandre (disambiguation)"
 Idálio Alexandre Ferreira (born 1983), Portuguese footballer known as "Xano", currently playing for Sligo Rovers